Şovu (also, Şuvi, Shovu, and Shuvi) is a village and municipality in the Lankaran Rayon of Azerbaijan.  It has a population of 1,674.  The municipality consists of the villages of Şovu and Təngivan.

References 

Populated places in Lankaran District